Scopula dimoeroides is a moth of the family Geometridae. It is found in Madagascar.

References

Moths described in 1956
dimoeroides
Moths of Madagascar